Macau Gallery Melaka is a gallery set up by the Government of Malacca in collaboration with the Government of Macau to promote and exhibit the culture and arts of Macau. It occupies the building which has a total built up area of 3,000 m2 and is made up of Straits-themed tiles and Siamese architecture, initially built as a British colonial government office before World War II.

Macau Gallery was first proposed by the Government of Malacca led by Mohd Ali Rustam, when the Chief Executive of Macau Edmund Ho paid an official visit to the state in 2007. After both governments agreed on a memorandum of understanding (MoU) for the management of the heritage building in 2009, the building was then renovated and converted into the gallery today, which was opened on 26 June 2012. The gallery is divided into four exhibition zones, which are: Macau Events, Macau World Heritage, Maritime Routes and "Origins and Culture".

Opening time
The gallery opens everyday in a week except Monday from 10 a.m. to 5 p.m. free of charge.

See also
 List of tourist attractions in Melaka
 Macau
 China–Malaysia relations

References

External links

 

2012 establishments in Malaysia
Art museums and galleries in Melaka